Devotion is the debut studio album by British musician Tirzah. It was released through Domino on 10 August 2018.

Track listing

Personnel
 Tirzah – primary artist, vocals
 Micachu – production, mixing
 Coby Sey - featured artist 
 Kwes – mixing, engineering
 Alexis Smith - engineering
 Christian Wright – mastering

Charts

References

External links
 

2018 debut albums
Tirzah (musician) albums
Domino Recording Company albums